János Ferenczi (born 3 April 1991) is a Hungarian football player currently playing for the Hungarian team Debreceni VSC as a midfielder.

International
He made his debut for Hungary national football team on 5 September 2019 in a friendly against Montenegro, as a 61st-minute substitute for Mihály Korhut.

Club statistics

Updated to games played as of 15 May 2022.

References

External links 
Profile at NSO.hu
Profile at HLSZ

1991 births
Living people
Sportspeople from Debrecen
Hungarian footballers
Hungary international footballers
Association football midfielders
Debreceni VSC players
Nemzeti Bajnokság I players